Beizhou or Bei Prefecture was a zhou (prefecture) in imperial China seated in modern Qinghe County in Hebei, China. It existed (intermittently) from 578 to 1048, when its name changed to En Prefecture after Wang Ze's rebellion in the prefecture.

Geography
The administrative region of Bei Prefecture in the Tang dynasty is in the border area of southeastern Hebei and western Shandong. It probably includes parts of modern: 
Under the administration of Xingtai, Hebei:
Qinghe County
Under the administration of Liaocheng, Shandong:
Linqing
Under the administration of Dezhou, Shandong:
Xiajin County
Wucheng County

References

 
 

Prefectures of the Sui dynasty
Prefectures of the Tang dynasty
Prefectures of the Song dynasty
Prefectures of Later Liang (Five Dynasties)
Prefectures of Later Han (Five Dynasties)
Prefectures of Later Jin (Five Dynasties)
Prefectures of Later Tang
Prefectures of Later Zhou
Former prefectures in Shandong
Former prefectures in Hebei
1048 disestablishments in Asia
11th-century disestablishments in China